During the 1997–98 English football season, Ipswich Town competed in the Football League First Division.

Season summary
For the second season running, Ipswich reached the playoffs, having won 16 of their last 20 games, but lost to Charlton Athletic who went on to be promoted.

First-team squad

Left club during season

Reserve squad

{{Fs player|no=|nat=ENG|pos=FW|name=

Competitions

Football League First Division

League table

Results summary

Legend

Ipswich Town's score comes first

Matches

First Division play-offs

FA Cup

League Cup

Transfers

Transfers in

Loans in

Transfers out

Loans out

Awards

Player awards

PFA First Division Team of the Year

References

Ipswich Town F.C. seasons
Ipswich Town